Healaugh may refer to the following places in North Yorkshire, England:

 Healaugh, Richmondshire, village in Swaledale
 Healaugh, Selby, village in Selby district